This is a list of Portuguese television related events from 1995.

Events
Unknown - Inês Santos, performing as Sinéad O'Connor wins the second series of Chuva de Estrelas.

Debuts

International
 My Little Pony Tales (RTP)
 Friends (Unknown)

Television shows

1990s
Chuva de Estrelas (1993-2000)

Ending this year

Births

Deaths